Richard Eichberg (27 October 1888 – 8 May 1952) was a German film director and producer. He directed 87 films between 1915 and 1949. He also produced 77 films between 1915 and 1950. He was born in Berlin, Germany and died in Munich, Germany.

Selected filmography

 Jettatore (1919)
 Sins of the Parents (1919)
 Child on the Open Road (1919)
 Der Fluch der Menschheit (1920)
 Hypnose (1920)
 Der Tanz auf dem Vulkan (1920)
 Im Rausche der Milliarden (1920)
 Evelyn's Love Adventures (1921)
 The Living Propeller (1921)
 Ihre Hoheit die Tänzerin (1922)
 Monna Vanna (1922)
 The Moneylender's Daughter (1922)
 The Romance of a Poor Sinner (1922)
 Girl of the Berlin Streets (1922)
 Fräulein Raffke (1923)
 The Most Beautiful Woman in the World (1924)
 The Motorist Bride (1925)
 Women of Luxury (1925)
 The Girl on the Road (1925)
 Love and Trumpets (1925)
 The Woman with That Certain Something (1925)
 Passion (1925)
 Princess Trulala (1926)
 The Prince and the Dancer (1926)
 Chaste Susanne (1926)
 Marie's Soldier (1927)
 The Prince of Pappenheim (1927)
 Fabulous Lola (1927)
 The Serfs (1928)
 Song (1928)
 The Woman from Till 12 (1928)
 Why Cry at Parting? (1929)
 The Flame of Love (English-language film, 1930)
 The Road to Dishonour (German-language film, 1930)
 Hai-Tang (French-language film, 1930)
 The Copper (German-language film, 1930)
 Night Birds (English-language film, 1930)
 Die Bräutigamswitwe (German-language film, 1931)
 Let's Love and Laugh (English-language film, 1931)
  (1931)
 The Daredevil (1931)
 The Invisible Front (1932)
 A Precocious Girl (co-director: Max Neufeld, 1934)
  (French-language film, 1935)
 Die Katz' im Sack (German-language film, 1935)
  (French-language film, 1935)
 Der Schlafwagenkontrolleur (German-language film, 1935)
 The Czar's Courier (German-language film, 1936)
 Michel Strogoff (French-language film, 1936)
 Es geht um mein Leben (1936)
 The Tiger of Eschnapur (German-language film, 1938)
 Le Tigre du Bengale (French-language film, 1938)
 The Indian Tomb (German-language film, 1938)
 Le Tombeau hindou (French-language film, 1938)
 The Trip to Marrakesh (1949)
 Scandal at the Embassy (dir. Erik Ode, 1950)

References

External links

1888 births
1952 deaths
Film people from Berlin